"Turtle Power!" (or simply "Turtle Power") is a song by American hip hop duo Partners in Kryme. The song was released by SBK Records and was from the Teenage Mutant Ninja Turtles soundtrack. An early unfinished version without Shane Faber's production was featured in the film's closing credits, and it is this version which is now commonly found on retro 90s compilations and on streaming sites, despite the fact the film mix was not officially released in the 1990s. In the UK, the film mix heard in the end credits featured the words "ninja" replaced with "hero", even though the film was not retitled the UK, unlike the 1987 cartoon series.  The track was also used in the 2013 Activision's video game Teenage Mutant Ninja Turtles: Out of the Shadows.

"Turtle Power" was released in April 1990 and reached number one on the UK Singles Chart for four weeks, making it the first hip hop single to reach number one in the United Kingdom and becoming the 13th-highest-selling single of the year in the United Kingdom. Additionally, the song peaked at number 13 on the US Billboard Hot 100, number four in Ireland, and number seven in New Zealand.

Song information

Written by James P Alpern and Richard A Usher Jr and produced by Partners in Kryme, "Turtle Power!" rode the wave of popularity of the Teenage Mutant Ninja Turtles franchise. A rap record featuring the use of vocoder vocals for the chorus, it became a worldwide hit, reaching number 13 on the US Billboard Hot 100, number seven in New Zealand and number one on the UK Singles Chart for four weeks in July and August 1990. The song was also coupled with the single "Turtle Rhapsody" and included in the third Ninja Turtles film soundtrack.

Track listings
7-inch and cassette single
 "Turtle Power" – 3:50
 "Splinter's Tale 1 & Splinter's Tale 2" (performed by John Du Prez) – 5:23

12-inch and German maxi-CD single
 "Turtle Power" (single edit) – 3:50
 "Turtle Power" (album version) – 4:17
 "Splinter's Tale 1 & Splinter's Tale 2" (performed by John Du Prez) – 5:23

Charts and certifications

Weekly charts

Year-end charts

Certifications

Release history

References

1990 singles
1990 songs
Hip hop songs
SBK Records singles
Teenage Mutant Ninja Turtles (1990 film series)
Teenage Mutant Ninja Turtles music
UK Singles Chart number-one singles